SBOA Matriculation and Higher Secondary School, Chennai is one of the schools run by the SBIOA Education Trust of the State Bank of India Officers Association in Anna Nagar Western Extension, Chennai, Tamil Nadu, India. The school educates students from LKG to class XII. It offers education as per the matriculation and Higher Secondary board of Tamil Nadu in English medium.

History
The SBIOA Educational Trust was founded in 1978 E. A. G. Moses, then general secretary of the State Bank of India Officers Association (Chennai Circle). The SBOA School & Junior College affiliated to the CBSE board was then started for the educating bank's officers' children. In 1983, the SBIOA Educational Trust started a new school providing education in matriculation board syllabus on the same campus and called it the SBOA Matriculation and Higher Secondary School. The school was moved to its current location in 1994. Later, the school acquired the then defunct Sri Chakra School nearby and developed it into an annexe campus.

Campuses
Main Campus houses classes from Standard IX to standard XII and the annexe houses classes from Standard I to VIII, primary and High school and also has a playground.

Student life
The school runs several clubs including Road Safety Patrol (RSP), Junior Red Cross (JRC), Scouts and Guides, National Cadet Corps (NCC), Interact club, School band and Skills for Adolescents (SFA). Activities are organized under four houses named after the major kingdoms in Tamil history. Students are placed in one of the four houses, with the teachers to guide them. The four houses of the school are namely, Cheran, Cholan, Pandian and Pallavan. The school has 2 libraries, one in each campus, which are fully air-conditioned and open till 5:30 PM. The annexe campus has an indoor shuttle court, an open-air auditorium and a basketball court. The main campus has a huge open space in the middle, around which the campus is built in a courtyard fashion. The main campus also has an extensive collection of exotic plant species in the roof garden.

Notable alumni
 Srikanth (actor), film actor
 Arya (actor), film actor
 Aravind, Business Leader
 Priya Bhavani Shankar, Film actor
 Shree Karthick, film director

References

Primary schools in Tamil Nadu
High schools and secondary schools in Chennai